Biles is a surname. Notable people with the name include:

 Daniel Biles (born 1952), American judge
 Ed Biles (19312020), American football coach and player
 Keith Biles, British politician
 Martin Biles (19192017), American javelin thrower
 Oliver Biles (born 1990), British actor
 Simone Biles (born 1997), American artistic gymnast
 William Biles (16441710), American judge

See also 
Bies (surname)
Bile (disambiguation)